Charles Street is a street in the West Village neighborhood of Manhattan in New York City. It runs east to west from Greenwich Avenue to West Street. The street was named after Charles Christopher Amos, who owned the parcel the street passed through. Amos is also the namesake of Christopher Street, two blocks to the south, and the former Amos Street, which is now West 10th Street. Charles Lane is a one-block alley located between Charles and Perry Streets and Washington and West Streets.  From 1866 to 1936, the section of Charles Street between Bleecker Street and West 4th Street was called Van Ness (sometimes Van Nest) Place after a farm, owned by the Van Ness family, which had occupied the square bounded by Bleecker, West 4th, Charles and Perry Streets until 1865.

Most of Charles Street – from Greenwich Avenue to Washington Street – is part of the Greenwich Village Historic District and Extensions, including the 1834 Federal style house at 131 Charles Street, which is both a New York City landmark (1966) and listed on the National Register of Historic Places (1972). Outside the historic district, but a designated city landmark (2007), is 159 Charles Street, the sole survivor of nine Greek revival houses built c.1838 at the former location of Newgate Prison.

Other buildings of note on Charles Street include the postmodern Memphis Downtown apartments at No. 140, designed by Rothzeid, Kaiserman, Thomson & Bee and completed in 1986; an eight-floor 2007 "glass box" apartment building at No. 163, designed by Daniel Goldner; Richard Meier's sixteen-story 165 Charles Street (2006), the third of a trio which includes 173 and 176 Perry Street, all of them glass boxes strung side-by-side along West Street; the 1930 ten-story Greenwich Towers at 726 Greenwich Street, which takes up the block of Greenwich Street between Charles and Perry Streets; and the 1840 brick row houses at 40, 50, and 52-54 Charles, which have been converted to studios.
 
No. 31 Charles Street, the Carolus Apartments, marks the former location of the Charles Street Presbyterian Church, which was founded in 1844 as the Third Associate Presbyterian Church. The Jewish Congregation Darech Amuno settled at 53 Charles Street in 1917, after having had multiple previous locations since its founding in 1838.  The synagogue was altered by Somerfield and Steckler from an existing building.

Notable residents 
 Rock musician Jon Bon Jovi bought a condo at 150 Charles Street in 2015.

References 
Informational notes

Citations

External links

Streets in Manhattan
Greenwich Village